The 1970 English cricket season was the 71st in which the County Championship had been an official competition. There was controversy when a tour by South Africa was forced to be abandoned because of mounting opposition to the apartheid policy perpetuated by the South African government. Five Tests were scheduled but the tour was officially cancelled at the request of Home Secretary James Callaghan. Instead, England played a highly successful series of unofficial Tests against a Rest of the World XI which was captained by Gary Sobers and included some of the best South African players such as Graeme Pollock, Eddie Barlow, Mike Procter and Barry Richards. These matches were promoted as Tests at the time, but were not recognised as such by the International Cricket Conference. Alan Jones played for England only in this series, and had the unfortunate experience of thinking that he had played in Tests only subsequently to discover that he had not. Kent won the County Championship title.

Honours
County Championship - Kent
Gillette Cup - Lancashire
Sunday League - Lancashire
Minor Counties Championship - Bedfordshire
Second XI Championship - Kent II 
Wisden - Jack Bond, Clive Lloyd, Brian Luckhurst, Glenn Turner, Roy Virgin

Test series

County Championship

Gillette Cup

Sunday League

Leading batsmen

Leading bowlers

References

Annual reviews
 Playfair Cricket Annual 1971
 Wisden Cricketers' Almanack 1971

External links
 CricketArchive – season and tournament itineraries

1970 in English cricket
English cricket seasons in the 20th century